Balakovsky District is an administrative and municipal district (raion), one of the thirty-eight in Saratov Oblast, Russia. It is located in the north of the oblast. Its administrative center is the city of Balakovo (which is not administratively a part of the district). Population: 19,617 (2010 Census);

Administrative and municipal status
Within the framework of administrative divisions, Balakovsky District is one of the thirty-eight in the oblast. The city of Balakovo serves as its administrative center, despite being incorporated separately as a city under oblast jurisdiction—an administrative unit with the status equal to that of the districts.

As a municipal division, the district is incorporated as Balakovsky Municipal District, with Balakovo City Under Oblast Jurisdiction being incorporated within it as Balakovo Urban Settlement.

References

Notes

Sources

Districts of Saratov Oblast
